The women's tournament of the volleyball at the 2022 South American Games was held from 10 to 14 October 2022 at the Paraguayan Volleyball Federation facilities in the SND complex cluster in Asunción, Paraguay. It was the sixth appearance of the volleyball women's tournament since the first edition in La Paz 1978 (it was not held from Santiago 1986 to Buenos Aires 2006).

Peru won the gold medal and their second South American Games women's volleyball title after beating Argentina by a narrow 3–2 score in the final. Chile beat the defending champions Colombia 3–0 to win the bronze medal.

Schedule
The tournament was held over a 5-day period, from 10 to 14 October.

Teams
A total of six ODESUR NOCs entered teams for the women's tournament.

Rosters

Each participating NOC had to enter a roster of 12 players (Technical manual Article 9.3).

Results
All match times are in PYST (UTC−3).

Preliminary round
The preliminary round or group stage consisted of two groups of 3 teams, each group was played under round-robin format with the top two teams progressing to the semi-finals and the third placed team of each group advancing to the fifth place match.

The pool ranking criteria was the following (Technical manual Articles 5.2 and 5.3):

 Number of matches won
 Match points
Match won 3–0 or 3–1: 3 points for the winner, 0 points for the loser
Match won 3–2: 2 points for the winner, 1 point for the loser
 Sets ratio
 Points ratio
 Result of the match between the tied teams

Pool A

Pool B

Final round
The final round consisted of the fifth place match (between the third placed teams of pools A and B), the semi-finals and the bronze and gold medal matches. The semi-finals match-ups were:

Semifinal 1: Winners Pool A v Runners-up Pool B
Semifinal 2: Winners Pool B v Runners-up Pool A

Winners of semi-finals played the gold medal match, while losers played the bronze medal match.

Semi-finals

Fifth place match

Bronze medal match

Gold medal match

Final ranking

Medalists

References

External links
 ASU2022 Volleyball Teams Female at ASU2022 official website.

Volleyball